Eurydemus is a genus of leaf beetles in the subfamily Eumolpinae. It is known from Africa and Fiji.

Taxonomy
The genus was first erected by the French entomologist Félicien Chapuis for a single species, Eurydemus insignis, reported from Australia and later Fiji. This species was later found to be a junior synonym of Rhyparida grandis, which itself was originally reported from New Caledonia. However, both the records from Australia and New Caledonia are possibly erroneous.

In 1965, British entomologist Brian J. Selman revised the genus, transferring all African species in it seen by him to Afroeurydemus and other related African genera. He suggested that it was almost certain Eurydemus was restricted to Fiji.

Species
Fijian species:

 Eurydemus grandis (Baly, 1861)

African species:

 Eurydemus aciculatopunctatus Bechyné, 1964
 Eurydemus aeneus Jacoby, 1897
 Eurydemus amabilis Brancsik, 1893
 Eurydemus carbonarius Bechyné, 1964
 Eurydemus confinis Bechyné, 1964
 Eurydemus congoensis Burgeon, 1942
 Eurydemus depressus Lefèvre, 1890
 Eurydemus diadematus Bechyné, 1964
 Eurydemus diadematus diadematus Bechyné, 1964
 Eurydemus diadematus marianus Bechyné, 1964
 Eurydemus femoralis Bryant, 1954
 Eurydemus freyi Bechyné, 1964
 Eurydemus hartmanni Harold, 1877
 Eurydemus illustris Bechyné, 1947
 Eurydemus impressicollis (Fairmaire, 1869)
 Eurydemus jodasi Bechyné, 1964
 Eurydemus limbatipennis Achard, 1915
 Eurydemus lineatocollis Burgeon, 1941
 Eurydemus metallicus Jacoby, 1892
 Eurydemus metallicus metallicus Jacoby, 1892
 Eurydemus metallicus sculpturatus Bechyné, 1956
 Eurydemus micheli Bechyné, 1947
 Eurydemus oculatus Chapuis, 1879
 Eurydemus onerosus Bechyné, 1947
 Eurydemus ophthalmicus Bechyné, 1947
 Eurydemus plagiatus Achard, 1915
 Eurydemus praequestus Bechyné, 1947
 Eurydemus raffrayi Lefèvre, 1891
 Eurydemus richardi Burgeon, 1941
 Eurydemus sobrinus Weise, 1903
 Eurydemus subimpressus (Fairmaire, 1902)
 Eurydemus villiersi Burgeon, 1941
 Eurydemus vittatus Gestro, 1895

Species moved to Microeurydemus:
 Eurydemus airensis Pic, 1950

References

Eumolpinae
Chrysomelidae genera
Taxa named by Félicien Chapuis
Beetles of Africa
Beetles of Oceania
Insects of Fiji